Ilias Bergal (born 6 April 1996) is a French rugby league footballer who plays for Toulouse Olympique as a er in the Betfred Championship. He previously played for the Leigh Centurions and the Swinton Lions.

Background
Bergal was born in Perpignan, France.

Club career
Bergal began his career in the junior teams of the Catalans Dragons, where he represented France at junior level and was a prolific try scorer for the club's reserve team. In 2017, Bergal joined the Swinton Lions on a short-term contract.

In October 2017, Bergal signed for the Leigh Centurions on a two-year contract.

International career
Bergal was named as a standby player for France's squad at the 2017 Rugby League World Cup. He was called into the main squad prior to the tournament when Hakim Miloudi was dropped for a breach of team discipline.

References

External links
Leigh Centurions profile
2017 RLWC profile

1996 births
Living people
AS Saint Estève players
France national rugby league team players
French rugby league players
Leigh Leopards players
Rugby league wingers
Sportspeople from Perpignan
Swinton Lions players
Toulouse Olympique players
Workington Town players